Rudolph Gideon Hedman (born 16 November 1964) is an English retired professional footballer who played as a defender.

Career
Born in Lambeth, Hedman signed as an apprentice for Colchester United in 1983, and he went on to make 219 appearances for the "U's" across two spells - the second a loan stint from Crystal Palace. His four-year stay with Palace was largely unsuccessful, although he made five appearances in the club's promotion season of 1988–89 and played in three out of the four play-off games which saw Palace reach the top flight. He moved on to play for Dulwich Hamlet in 1992 and later Stevenage Borough. He also played in Singapore and Hong Kong with Sing Tao before returning to England. After retiring from playing, Hedman joined the Colchester Centre of Excellence coaching staff.

Personal life
His sister Deta Hedman is a professional darts player with several titles to her name.

Honours

Club
Crystal Palace
 Football League Second Division playoff winner: 1988–89

Colchester United
 Football Conference runner-up: 1990–91

Individual
 Colchester United Player of the Year: 1987

References

External links
 
 

1964 births
Living people
Footballers from the London Borough of Lambeth
English footballers
Association football defenders
Colchester United F.C. players
Crystal Palace F.C. players
Leyton Orient F.C. players
Dulwich Hamlet F.C. players
Stevenage F.C. players
Sing Tao SC players
English Football League players
Expatriate footballers in Hong Kong
English expatriate sportspeople in Hong Kong
English expatriate footballers
Colchester United F.C. non-playing staff